I Need You Baby may refer to:

"I Need You Baby", Rolling Stones cover of "Mona (I Need You Baby)", song by Bo Diddley 1967
"I Need You Baby", song written for the Orioles by Deborah Chessler 1954
"I Need You Baby", song by George W. Weston 1958
"I Need You Baby", song by The Nashville Teens 1964, McDaniels
"I Need You Baby", single by Jesse James, written by Audrey Calvin 1971
"I Need You Baby", B-side of "Shake Your Money Maker' by Elmore James
"I Need You Baby", song by Arthur Alexander 1968
"I Need You Baby", song by Ray Conniff 1975
"I Need You Baby", song by Chuck Berry from Rockit 1979
"I Need You Baby", song by Little Milton 1983